Campanella is an Italian surname. Notable people with the surname include:

Alyssa Campanella, Miss USA 2011
Frank Campanella (1919–2006), U.S. actor
Joseph Campanella (1927–2018), U.S. actor
Juan J. Campanella (born 1959), Argentine film director
Michele Campanella (born 1947), Italian pianist and conductor
Rob Campanella, U.S. musician (The Quarter After)
Roy Campanella (1921–1993), U.S. baseball player
Tommaso Campanella (1568–1639), Italian philosopher, theologian and poet

Italian-language surnames